Eleanor Adviento (born 18 April 1995 in Manila, Philippines; also known as Eleanor D Reyes) is a New Zealand female curler.

At the national level, she is a two-time New Zealand women's champion curler (2015, 2016) and two-time New Zealand mixed champion curler (2016, 2017).

Teams and events

Women's

Mixed

Mixed doubles

References

External links

Eleanor Adviento | New Zealand Olympic Team
Eleanor Adviento - Player Profile - Curling - Eurosport

 Video:
 
 

1995 births
Living people
New Zealand female curlers
Curlers at the 2012 Winter Youth Olympics
New Zealand curling champions
People from Manila